Mellbye is a surname. Notable people with the surname include:

Fredrik Mellbye (1917–1999), Norwegian physician
Hilde Britt Mellbye (born 1961), Norwegian businesswoman
Jan E. Mellbye (1913–2009), Norwegian farmer and politician
Jens Christian Mellbye (1914–1993), Norwegian judge
Johan E. Mellbye (1866–1954), Norwegian farmer and politician